Aspen Vincent (née Miller, born September 8, 1978) is an American Broadway actress and singer.

A native of Pacific Beach, San Diego, she started doing theater at the age of nine, and would also perform with the Christian Community Theater and Starlight Musical Theatre, as well as being called to the Sydmonton Festival. Aspen enrolled at Chapman University to study musical therapy, dropping out at the third year due to many job offers.

As a voice actress, she played the role of Dodie Bishop in Nickelodeon's Emmy-nominated As Told by Ginger, Alice in the Rugrats episode "Hurricane Alice", Amanda Payne in the pilot for Constant Payne, and did the voices of three different characters in the PC game EverQuest II. Vincent sang the National Anthem for the L.A. Lakers, the Mighty Ducks of Anaheim, and the San Diego Chargers and performed in an a cappella group called Groove 66 at Disney California Adventure Park.

Early in her professional career she was a regular in the recording studio, recording jingles and commercials, as well as providing singing voices for Disney characters for their touring productions. Aspen spent 2004-2005 in Las Vegas,  performing nightly at the Paris Las Vegas as the female lead "Scaramouche" in the rock musical We Will Rock You, where she met her future husband, Tony Vincent, a singer and stage actor, and guitarist Paul Crook, who would recommend her for Meat Loaf's Neverland Express after Patti Russo left the band. Following auditions, Aspen would tour with Meat Loaf as his duet partner and backup vocalist on the Seize the Night tour, through 2006 and 2007.

Aspen also toured with the cast of Dirty Dancing in America with her husband Tony, and would later be a swing in the Broadway production of American Idiot, a show featuring songs of the popular band Green Day and Tony in one of the main roles. Afterwards, she starred in the 2011 staging of Sleeping Beauty Wakes at both the McCarter Theatre in Princeton, New Jersey, and the La Jolla Playhouse in San Diego, California.

Aspen and Tony have two children, a daughter born in 2012 and a son born in 2018. They are divorced as of 2020 and both living in Nashville, Tennessee.

References

External links

Place of birth missing (living people)
Living people
American voice actresses
American women singers
Neverland Express members
Actresses from San Diego
Chapman University alumni
Year of birth missing (living people)
21st-century American women